Events in 1975 in animation.

Events

January
 January 5: 
 The first episode of Dog of Flanders is broadcast, an adaptation of Ouida's novel A Dog of Flanders.
 The first episode of Paddington is broadcast, based on the eponymous children's books by Michael Bond.
 January 11: An animated TV special of the 2000 Year Old Man sketch is broadcast on CBS, with Mel Brooks and Carl Reiner reprising their characters. The animation is produced by Leo Salkin Films.

March
 March 21: Tomoharu Katsumata and Tim Reid's Hans Christian Andersen's The Little Mermaid premieres.

April
 April 1: 
 Alexander Schure's Tubby the Tuba is first released.
 The first episode of the television series Maya the Honey Bee is broadcast.
 April 3: Monty Python and the Holy Grail premieres which has several animated intermezzos and combinations of animation with live-action, directed by Terry Gilliam.
 April 8: 47th Academy Awards: Closed Mondays by Will Vinton and Bob Gardiner wins the Academy Award for Best Animated Short Film.

June
 June 11: Raúl daSilva's Rime of the Ancient Mariner premieres.

July
 July 17: Manuel García Ferré's Trapito premieres.

August
 August 20: Ralph Bakshi's film Coonskin, a combination of animation and live-action, premieres. It flops at the box office due to accusations of racism, but decades later became a cult classic and shed its undeserved bad reputation.
 August 28: Kjell Aukrust's The Pinchcliffe Grand Prix is first released.

September
 September 4: Belgian cartoonist Picha and Boris Szulzinger release their animated feature film debut Tarzoon: Shame of the Jungle which will become a cult classic.
 September 6: 
 The first episode of The Secret Lives of Waldo Kitty, produced by Filmation, is broadcast.
 The first episode of Uncle Croc's Block is broadcast, a live-action children's TV show with animated intermezzo's: M*U*S*H, Fraidy Cat and Wacky and Packy.
 September 8: John Hubley's Everybody Rides the Carousel premieres.

October
 October 1: The first episode of Arabian Nights: Sinbad's Adventures is broadcast.
 October 5: The first episode of Grendizer is broadcast. 
 October 6: The first episode of The Adventures of Pepero is broadcast.
 October 10: The first episode of Bod is broadcast.
 October 15: The first episode of Ikkyū-san is broadcast.
 October 23: Yuri Norstein's Hedgehog in the Fog premieres.

November
 November 9: Sally Cruikshank's Quasi at the Quackadero is first released which will become a cult classic.

December
 December 19: Bob Clampett releases the anthology film Bugs Bunny: Superstar, directed by Larry Jackson which is the first Looney Tunes package film. The film will attract controversy amongst some of Clampett's colleagues, most obviously Chuck Jones, because Clampett takes credit for many contestable claims.
 December 24: Per Åhlin's Sagan om Karl-Bertil Jonssons julafton is first released which in Sweden will become an annual Christmas tradition.
 December 25: William Feigenbaum and József Gémes' Hugo the Hippo premieres.

Specific date unknown
 Halas and Batchelor animates the music video for Roger Glover's song Love Is All in which a singing frog with a guitar gathers animals for a ball in the forest.
 Bill Melendez' Dick Deadeye, or Duty Done premieres, based on designs by Ronald Searle.
 André Leduc and Bernard Longpré's Monsieur Pointu premieres.
 The first episode of Leopold the Cat is broadcast.
 Robert Swarthe's Kick Me premieres.
 Bob Godfrey's Great premieres.
 Chuck Jones' adaptation of Rudyard Kipling's Rikki-Tikki-Tavi is released.

Films released 

 January 1 - Moby-Dick (Australia)
 January 22 - La Genèse (France)
 March 21 - Hans Christian Andersen's The Little Mermaid (Japan)
 March 27 - Robinson Columbus (Denmark)
 April 1 - Tubby the Tuba (United States)
 June 11 - Rime of the Ancient Mariner (United States)
 July 17 - Trapito (Argentina)
 August 20 - Coonskin (United States)
 August 27 - Donald Duck's Frantic Antic (United States)
 August 28:
 Pinchcliffe Grand Prix (Norway)
 William Tell (United States)
 August 29 - Walt Disney's Cartoon Carousel (United States)
 September - Dick Deadeye, or Duty Done (United Kingdom)
 September 3 - Bedbug-75, or Mayakovsky's Laughing (Soviet Union)
 September 4 - Tarzoon: Shame of the Jungle (France and Belgium)
 October 24 - The Humpbacked Horse (Soviet Union)
 November 15 - The Mysterious Island (Australia)
 November 27:
 Ivanhoe (Australia)
 The Last of the Mohicans (United States and Australia)
 December 14 - Hugo the Hippo (Hungary and United States)
 December 19 - Bugs Bunny: Superstar (United States)
 Specific date unknown: 
 Junma feiteng (China)
 The Story of the Chinese Gods (Taiwan)

Television series 

 January 1 - Kérem a következőt! debuts on Magyar Televízió.
 January 5: 
 Dog of Flanders debuts on Fuji TV.
 Paddington debuts on BBC1.
 January 7 - Manga Nihon Mukashi Banashi debuts on TBS.
 April 1 - Maya the Honey Bee debuts on NET (now TV Asahi).
 April 4:
 Brave Raideen debuts on Nihon Educational Television.
 La Seine no Hoshi debuts on Fuji TV.
 April 5 - Don Chuck Monogatari debuts on Tokyo Channel 12.
 April 7 - Ganba no Bōken debuts on Nippon TV.
 May 15 - Getter Robo G debuts on Fuji TV.
 July 2 - Tekkaman: The Space Knight debuts on NET TV.
 September 6: 
 Fraidy Cat, M*U*S*H, The Great Grape Ape Show, The Oddball Couple, The Tom and Jerry Show, Uncle Croc's Block, and Wacky and Packy debut on ABC.
 Return to the Planet of the Apes and The Secret Lives of Waldo Kitty debut on NBC.
 September 16 - Peter Puck debuts on NBC.
 October 1 - Arabian Nights: Sinbad's Adventures debuts on Fuji TV.
 October 3 - Wanpaku Omukashi Kum-Kum debuts on TBS.
 October 4 - Time Bokan debuts on Fuji TV.
 October 5: 
 Steel Jeeg debuts on NET (now TV Asahi).
 Grendizer debuts on Fuji TV.
 October 6:
 Ganso Tensai Bakabon debuts on Nippon TV.
 The Adventures of Pepero debuts on NET Network.
 October 7 - Laura, The Prairie Girl debuts on TBS.
 October 15 - Ikkyū-san debuts on NET TV.
 December 23 - Bod debuts on BBC1.
 Specific date unknown: 
 Animal Kwackers debuts on ITV.
 Leopold the Cat debuts on Russia-1.
 Noddy debuts on ITV.
 The Undersea Adventures of Captain Nemo debuts on CBS.

Births

January
 January 1: Eiichiro Oda, Japanese manga artist (creator of One Piece).
 January 3:
 Jason Marsden, American voice actor (voice of Kovu in The Lion King II: Simba's Pride and The Lion Guard, Peter Pan in Peter Pan and the Pirates, teenage Clark Kent in Superman: The Animated Series, Richie Foley / Gear and Edwin Alva Jr. in Static Shock, Billy Numerous in Teen Titans, Snapper Carr in Justice League, Danger Duck in Loonatics Unleashed, Haku in Spirited Away, Nermal in the Garfield franchise, Michael in Cartoon All-Stars to the Rescue, Kid Flash and Atom in Young Justice, King Louie and Shere Khan in Jungle Cubs, Firefly in The Batman, Cavin in seasons 4 and 5 of Adventures of the Gummi Bears, continued voice of Max Goof).
 Danica McKellar, American actress (voice of Miss Martian in Young Justice, Frieda Goren in Static Shock, Frost in DC Super Hero Girls, Judy Jetson in The Jetsons & WWE: Robo-WrestleMania!).
 January 6: Yukana Nogami, Japanese actress and singer (voice of Honoka Yukishiro / Cure White in Futari wa Pretty Cure, Azuki in Azuki-chan, Yuri Tanima in Wedding Peach, Meiling Li in Cardcaptor Sakura, Tessa in Full Metal Panic, Ulrike in Kyo Kara Maoh!, Yumiko Tomi in Fafner in the Azure, C.C. in Code Geass, Cecilia Alcott in Infinite Stratos, Kale in Dragon Ball Super, Kanna in Inuyasha).
 January 17: Freddy Rodriguez, American actor (voice of Mas y Menos in Teen Titans and Teen Titans Go!, Miguel O'Hara / Spider-Man 2099 in Ultimate Spider-Man, Caesar Salazar in Generator Rex).
 January 28: Hiroshi Kamiya, Japanese actor (voice of Levi Ackerman in Attack on Titan, Trafalgar Law in One Piece, Mephisto Pheles in Blue Exorcist, Izaya Orihara in Durarara!!, Shinji Matō in the Fate franchise, Takashi Natsume in Natsume's Book of Friends, Choromatsu in Mr. Osomatsu, Akashi Seijuro in Kuroko's Basketball, Yuzuru Otonashi in Angel Beats!, Yato in Noragami, Nozomu Itoshiki in Sayonara, Zetsubou-Sensei, Koyomi Araragi in Monogatari, Sōma in Working!!, Juli in Brothers Conflict, Balder Hringhorni in Kamigami no Asobi, Tieria Erde in Mobile Suit Gundam 00, Saiki Kusuo in The Disastrous Life of Saiki K., Kinshirō Kusatsu in Cute High Earth Defense Club Love!).
 January 29: Sara Gilbert, American actress, director and producer (voice of Laura Powers in The Simpsons episode "New Kid on the Block", Cindy in the Rugrats episode "Cynthia Comes Alive").
 January 30: Yumi Yoshimura, Japanese singer, musician, actress and member of PUFFY (portrayed herself in the live action segments of Hi Hi Puffy AmiYumi, performed the theme songs of Teen Titans and Hi Hi Puffy AmiYumi).
 January 31: Jorge R. Gutierrez, Mexican animator (El Tigre: The Adventures of Manny Rivera, The Book of Life, Maya and the Three) and voice actor (voice of Ghostbear in Rise of the Teenage Mutant Ninja Turtles, Sal in Victor and Valentino, King Teca in Maya and the Three).

February
 February 2: Myriam Sirois, Canadian voice actress (voice of Akane Tendo in Ranma 1/2).
 February 5: Ana Lúcia Menezes, Brazilian actress (dub voice of Amy Rose in Sonic X and Sonic Boom, Margaret in Regular Show, Gwen Tennyson in Ben 10, Misa Amane in Death Note, Koto in Yu Yu Hakusho, Ikon Eron in Gormiti), (d. 2021).
 February 7: Dan Green, American voice actor, voice director, and screenwriter (voice of Yugi Moto in Yu-Gi-Oh! Duel Monsters).
 February 15: Brendan Small, American actor, stand-up comedian, animator, writer, director, producer, and musician (Home Movies, Metalocalypse).
 February 16: Rebecca Shoichet, Canadian voice actress (singing voice of Twilight Sparkle in My Little Pony: Friendship is Magic, voice of Sunset Shimmer in My Little Pony: Equestria Girls).
 February 17: Raymond S. Persi, American animator, storyboard artist (The Twisted Tales of Felix the Cat, Teacher's Pet, Harvey Birdman, Attorney at Law, The Simpsons, Walt Disney Animation Studios), writer and director (The Simpsons, Neighbors from Hell, Extinct, Peanuts specials).
 February 21: Drew Barrymore, American actress, producer (Olive, the Other Reindeer), talk show host and author (voice of the title character in Olive, the Other Reindeer, Akima in Titan A.E., Mrs. Lockhart and Jillian Russell in Family Guy, Maggie Dunlop in Curious George, Sophie Krustofsky and herself in The Simpsons episodes "Insane Clown Poppy" and "The King of Nice").
 February 23: Michael Cornacchia, American actor (voice of Bouncing Boy in Legion of Super Heroes, Frankie in Happy Feet).
 February 26: Matthew Faughnan, American animator and director (The Simpsons).

March
 March 15: will.i.am, American musician and member of the Black Eyed Peas (voice of Moto Moto in Madagascar: Escape 2 Africa, Snow in Arthur and the Revenge of Maltazard, Pedro in Rio and Rio 2, Bernard Bernard in The Cleveland Show, himself in The Cleveland Show episode "Menace II Secret Society", performed the theme song of Samurai Jack).  
 March 16: Eban Schletter, American composer and songwriter (SpongeBob SquarePants, Father of the Pride, Drawn Together, The Patrick Star Show).
 March 30: Valentina Garza, Cuban-American television writer and producer (The Simpsons, Bordertown).
 Specific date unknown: Nigel Pilkington, English actor (voice of Gill in Dragons: Rescue Riders, Drac in Super Monsters, Percy in Thomas & Friends, Squirrel Nutkin in Peter Rabbit, Tabaqui and Rikki-Tikki-Tavi in The Jungle Book).

April
 April 2: Deedee Magno Hall, American actress and singer (voice of Pearl in the Steven Universe franchise, Snuggs in Doc McStuffins).
 April 4: Pamela Ribon, American screenwriter (Moana, Smurfs: The Lost Village, Ralph Breaks the Internet, My Year of Dicks), author, television writer, blogger and actress (voice of Snow White in Ralph Breaks the Internet, Kaori in City Hunter).
 April 6: Zach Braff, American actor and filmmaker (voice of the title character in Chicken Little, Paul Revere and X-Stream Mike in Clone High, himself in the BoJack Horseman episodes "Underground" and "The View from Halfway Down").
 April 7: Tiki Barber, American former football running back (voice of Touchdown Tiki in the Wow! Wow! Wubbzy! episode "What a Card").
 April 13: Angus MacLane, American film director, animator, screenwriter and voice actor (Pixar).
 April 15: Elissa Knight, American voice actress and assistant (voice of Tia in Cars, EVE in WALL-E).
 April 22: Dannah Phirman, Israeli-born American actress (voice of Zaria in Tak and the Power of Juju, the title character, Claire McCallister, Chuck the Evil Sandwich Making Guy's Mother, Edith Von Hoosinghaus and Pretty Princess in WordGirl, Penny in The Mighty B!,  The Moon and Ben's Mom in Talking Tom and Friends, Missy in The Fairly OddParents episode "Finding Emo"), comedian and writer (The Mighty B!, WordGirl, The Mr. Peabody & Sherman Show).

May
 May 3: Christina Hendricks, American actress (voice of Gabby Gabby in Toy Story 4, Zarina in The Pirate Fairy, Cherie in Solar Opposites, Lois Lane in All-Star Superman, Officer Jaffe in Scoob!, Naydern in the American Dad! episode "Gorillas in the Mist", Unity in the Rick and Morty episode "Auto Erotic Assimilation").
 May 8: Kaspar Jancis, Estonian film director and musician (Frank ja Wendy, Captain Morten and the Spider Queen).
 May 9: Chris Diamantopoulos, Canadian actor (voice of Mickey Mouse in Mickey Mouse and The Wonderful World of Mickey Mouse, Darkwing Duck and Storkules in DuckTales, Green Arrow in Batman Unlimited and Justice League Action).
 May 10: Julie Nathanson, American actress (voice of Rosalie Rowan in the DC Animated Universe, Black Widow in Avengers Assemble, Gilda Dent in Batman: The Long Halloween, Silver Banshee in Suicide Squad: Hell to Pay, Ally in the Megas XLR episode "Terminate Her", continued voice of Belle).
 May 15: Ben Whitehead, English actor (voice of Baker Bob in A Matter of Loaf and Death, The Pirate Who Likes Sunsets and Kittens in the UK dub of The Pirates! In an Adventure with Scientists!, continued voice of Wallace in the Wallace and Gromit franchise, additional voices in Early Man).
 May 17: Rufus Jones, English actor (voice of Hugo in 101 Dalmatian Street, the Flying Scotsman in Thomas & Friends).
 May 20: Marc Thompson, American actor (voice of Kevin Thompson, Anthony DeMartino, Timothy O'Neill, and Jamie White in Daria, Shark, Bee, Robot and Turtle in WordWorld, Casey Jones in Teenage Mutant Ninja Turtles, Knut in Winx Club, Dante Vale in Huntik: Secrets & Seekers, the title character in P. King Duckling, Megatron in Transformers: Cyberverse).
 May 27: André 3000, American musician and actor (voice of Senator Harvey in the Brad Neely's Harg Nallin' Sclopio Peepio episode "For Aretha", co-creator and voice of Sunny Bridges in Class of 3000).
 May 30: Loni Steele Sosthand, American television writer (The Simpsons).

June
 June 4:
Angelina Jolie, American actress (voice of Master Tigress in the Kung Fu Panda franchise, Lola in Shark Tale).
Russell Brand, English comedian and actor (voice of Dr. Nefario in the Despicable Me franchise, Creek in Trolls, himself in The Simpsons episode "Angry Dad: The Movie").
 June 13: Daniel Ingram, Canadian composer and lyricist (DHX Media, Kung-Fu Magoo, Nina's World, We're Lalaloopsy, Esme & Roy).
 June 25: Linda Cardellini, American actress (voice of Wendy Corduroy in Gravity Falls, Marcy 'Hot Dog Water' Fleach in Scooby-Doo: Mystery Incorporated, CJ in Regular Show).
 June 28: Jeff Geddis, Canadian actor (voice of Devin and Tom in Total Drama Presents: The Ridonculous Race).

July
 July 6: Alessandro Juliani, Canadian actor (voice of L in Death Note, Kid Icarus in Captain N: The Game Master, Gambit in X-Men: Evolution, Lobo in Super Monsters).
 July 10: Stefán Karl Stefánsson, Icelandic actor and singer (portrayed Robbie Rotten in LazyTown), (d. 2018).
 July 12: Phil Lord, American producer (The Lego Batman Movie, The Lego Ninjago Movie, Spider-Man: Into the Spider-Verse, Bless the Harts, The Mitchells vs. the Machines, co-creator of Clone High), director (Cloudy with a Chance of Meatballs, The Lego Movie), writer (Cloudy with a Chance of Meatballs 2, The Lego Movie 2: The Second Part) and voice actor.
 July 20:
Jason Raize, American actor and singer (voice of Denahi in Brother Bear), (d. 2004).
Judy Greer, American actress (voice of Cheryl Tunt in Archer, Beep in Ask the StoryBots, Luna in Let's Go Luna!, Wendy Park in Glenn Martin, DDS, Yuki in The Cat Returns, Martha Washington in America: The Motion Picture).

August
 August 6: Trista H. Navarro, American animation production manager (The Simpsons, The Simpsons Movie), (d. 2019).
 August 7: Christy Hui, Chinese producer (creator of Xiaolin Showdown and Xiaolin Chronicles).
 August 11: Roger Craig Smith, American actor (voice of Sonic in the Sonic the Hedgehog franchise, Captain America in Ultimate Spider-Man, Avengers Assemble, Hulk and the Agents of S.M.A.S.H., Guardians of the Galaxy, Spider-Man, Marvel Disk Wars: The Avengers, and Marvel Future Avengers, Warden Wrath and Jacob Hopkins in The Owl House, Hawkodile and Richard in Unikitty!, Steam Smythe, the Forever Knight, and Diamondhead in Ben 10, Ocean Master in Young Justice, Captain Marvel in The Avengers: Earth's Mightiest Heroes, Mister Miracle in the Justice League Action episode "It'll Take A Miracle!").
 August 12: Zeke Johnson, American animator, storyboard artist (Family Guy, American Dad!), background artist (Futurama, Baby Blues, What a Cartoon!) and prop designer (Futurama, Baby Blues, American Dad!).
 August 18: Kaitlin Olson, American actress (voice of Destiny in Finding Dory, Ethel Anderson in season 1 of Brickleberry, Quinn Hopper in The Simpsons episode "The Girl Code").
 August 29: Dante Basco, American voice actor (voice of Zuko in Avatar: The Last Airbender, the title character in American Dragon: Jake Long, Javier in Victor and Valentino, Scorpion in Ultimate Spider-Man, Tuck in Generator Rex, Matt Martin / Kewl Breeze in Zevo-3).
 August 31: Sara Ramirez, Mexican-American actor and singer (voice of Queen Miranda in Sofia the First).

September
 September 1: John Aoshima, American animator (Baby Blues, Futurama, What a Cartoon!, Looney Tunes, The Simpsons, Avatar: The Last Airbender), storyboard artist (Family Guy, Disney Television Animation, Kung Fu Panda: Legends of Awesomeness, American Dad!, Kubo and the Two Strings, Maya and the Three), sheet timer (Star vs. the Forces of Evil), writer (The LeBrons) and director (American Dad!, Disney Television Animation).
 September 2: 
 Brad Ableson, American animator (The Simpsons, The Life & Times of Tim), storyboard artist (The Simpsons, The Simpsons Movie), director (Minions: The Rise of Gru) and producer (co-creator of Good Vibes and Legends of Chamberlain Heights).
 MC Chris, American rapper, voice actor, comedian and writer (voice of MC Pee Pants in Aqua Teen Hunger Force, Hesh Hepplewhite in Sealab 2021).
 September 10: Gabe Swarr, American animator (Spümcø, What a Cartoon!, El Tigre: The Adventures of Manny Rivera), storyboard artist (The Ripping Friends, Dexter's Laboratory, Nickelodeon Animation Studio, ¡Mucha Lucha!, The Buzz on Maggie, Coconut Fred's Fruit Salad Island, Brandy & Mr. Whiskers), character designer (Poochini), background artist (Boo Boo Runs Wild), writer (Dexter's Laboratory, My Life as a Teenage Robot, Shorty McShorts' Shorts), producer (Animaniacs) and director (Spümcø, Shorty McShorts' Shorts, Nickelodeon Animation Studio).
 September 16: Toks Olagundoye, Nigerian actress (voice of Nanefua Pizza in Steven Universe, Bentina Beakley in DuckTales, Cleo in Carmen Sandiego, Mel Medarda in Arcane, Krang Two in Rise of the Teenage Mutant Ninja Turtles: The Movie, Zamfir in Castlevania).
 September 18: Jason Sudeikis, American actor and comedian (voice of Red in The Angry Birds Movie and The Angry Birds Movie 2, Justin Pin and Ares in Next Gen, Holt Ritcher and Terry Kimple in The Cleveland Show, Bryce Fowler in Hit-Monkey, Professor Bomba in Epic).
 September 19: Jim Hecht, American screenwriter (The Fairly OddParents, Ice Age).
 September 23: Christopher Miller, American film director (Cloudy with a Chance of Meatballs, The Lego Movie), writer (Cloudy with a Chance of Meatballs 2, The Lego Movie 2: The Second Part, co-creator of Clone High), producer (The Lego Batman Movie, The Lego Ninjago Movie, Spider-Man: Into the Spider-Verse, Bless the Harts, The Mitchells vs. the Machines) and voice actor.

October
 October 3: Alanna Ubach, American actress (voice of the title character in El Tigre: The Adventures of Manny Rivera, Ansi Molina in Welcome to the Wayne, Rook Shar and Rook Ben in Ben 10: Omniverse, Liz Allan in The Spectacular Spider-Man, Mamá Imelda in Coco).
October 5: 
Scott Weinger, American actor (voice of the title character in the Aladdin franchise and House of Mouse).
Monica Rial, American actress (voice of Kyoko Tokiwa in Full Metal Panic!, Minamo Kurosawa in Azumanga Daioh, Sayuki in Initial D, Bulma in Dragon Ball Z Kai and Dragon Ball Super, Tsubaki Nakatsukasa in Soul Eater, Shizuka Marikawa in Highschool of the Dead, Mirajane Strauss in Fairy Tail, Kaede Kayano in Assassination Classroom, Tsuyu Asui / Froppy in My Hero Academia).
Kate Winslet, English actress (voice of Rita Malone in Flushed Away, Madame Mumblechook in Mary and the Witch's Flower).
 October 16: Kellie Martin, American actress (voice of Daphne Blake in A Pup Named Scooby-Doo, Molly Tazmanian Devil in Taz-Mania, Sadira in Aladdin, Roxanne in A Goofy Movie, Oracle in The Batman episode "Artifacts").
 October 20:
 Natalie Gregory, American former child actress (voice of Jenny in Oliver & Company).
 Brian Iles, American animator (The Simpsons, The Oblongs), storyboard artist (Drawn Together, American Dad!, Family Guy) and director (Family Guy).

November
 November 2: Danny Cooksey, American actor (voice of Montana Max in Tiny Toon Adventures, Urchin in The Little Mermaid, Wendall Malone in The Completely Mental Misadventures of Ed Grimley, the title character in Dave the Barbarian, Francis Stone / Hotstreak in Static Shock, Jack Spicer in Xiaolin Showdown, Brad Buttowski in Kick Buttowski: Suburban Daredevil, Paul Cheechoo in The Secret Saturdays, Peter Lik in What's with Andy?, Greg Skeens in Recess, Milo Kamalani in Pepper Ann, Mooch in 101 Dalmatians: The Series, Peng in Kung Fu Panda: Legends of Awesomeness).
 November 26: DJ Khaled, American DJ, record executive, author and record producer (voice of Ears in Spies in Disguise).

December
 December 1: David Hornsby, American actor, screenwriter and producer (voice of Brandon in The X's, Fanboy in Fanboy & Chum Chum, Tyson, Vivian, Radley and Edwardo in Sanjay and Craig, Wildvine in Ben 10, Leif Bornewell III in Welcome to the Wayne, Riddler in DC Super Hero Girls, Harry in the We Bare Bears episode "Christmas Movies", co-creator of and voice of Joel Zymanski in Unsupervised).
 December 6: Sayaka Ohara, Japanese voice actress (voice of Layla Hamilton in Kaleido Star, Yūko Ichihara in xxxHolic, Beatrice in Umineko When They Cry, Milly Ashford in Code Geass, Erza Scarlet in Fairy Tail, Irisviel in Fate/Zero).
 December 12:
Houko Kuwashima, Japanese actress (voice of Itsuki Myoudouin / Cure Sunshine in HeartCatch PreCure!, Sango in Inuyasha, Kenny Kyouju in Beyblade, Kagura in Azumanga Daioh, Hitomi in GeGeGe no Kitaro, Nene Amano in Digimon Fusion).
Mayim Bialik, American actress, television personality, and author (voice of Brittany Bright in The Adventures of Hyperman, Maria in Hey Arnold!, Kirsten Kurst in Recess, Mean Cindy in Lloyd in Space, Great Sphinx in the Blaze and the Monster Machines episode "Race to the Top of the World", Willoughby in the Star vs. the Forces of Evil episode "Fetch").
 December 18: Sia, Australian singer and songwriter (voice of Songbird Serenade in My Little Pony: The Movie, Mrs. Tiggy-Winkle in Peter Rabbit and Peter Rabbit 2: The Runaway, Half-Oracle in Charming, Autotuned Randy in the South Park episode "The Cissy", herself in the Scooby-Doo and Guess Who? episode "Now You Sia, Now You Don't!").

Specific date unknown
 Dan Santat, American author and illustrator (creator of The Replacements).

Deaths

January
 January 22: Hazel Sewell, American animator (Walt Disney Company), dies at age 76.
 January 27: Bill Walsh, American film producer, screenwriter and comics writer (Mary Poppins, Bedknobs and Broomsticks), dies at age 61.

February
 February 23: Frank Smith, American animator and film director (Fleischer Studios, UPA, Peanuts animated specials), dies at age 63.

March
 March 2: Salvador Mestres, Spanish animator, film director and comics artist (Hispano Grafic Films), dies at age 64 or 65.

May
 May 8: Abe Levitow, American animator (Warner Bros. Cartoons, MGM animation, UPA) and director (Mr. Magoo's Christmas Carol, The Phantom Tollbooth), dies at age 52.

June
 June 19: Ge Ge Pearson, American actress (second voice of Crusader Rabbit in Crusader Rabbit), dies at age 58. 
 July 19: Manny Gould, American animator (Barré Studio, Paramount Studios, Columbia Pictures, Warner Bros. Cartoons, Ed Graham Productions, DePatie-Freleng Enterprises, Ralph Bakshi), dies at age 71.

August
 August 14 Frank Marsales, Canadian composer (Warner Bros. Cartoons, Walter Lantz Studios), dies at age 88.

September
 September 4: Walter Tetley, American actor (voice of Felix the Cat, Andy Panda, Sherman in The Adventures of Rocky and Bullwinkle and Friends), dies at age 60.

October
 October 16: Don Barclay, American actor and caricaturist (voice of the Doorman in Cinderella), dies at age 82.
 October 29: John Scott Trotter, American arranger, composer and orchestra leader (Peanuts), dies at age 67.

November
 November 28: Valentina Brumberg, Russian animator and film director (The Tale of Tsar Saltan, The Lost Letter, The Night Before Christmas, It Was I Who Drew the Little Man), dies at age 76.

December
 December 7: Hardie Albright, American actor (voice of adolescent Bambi in Bambi), dies at age 71. 
 December 18: Ray Bailey, American animator and comics artist (Fleischer Brothers), dies at age 62.
 December 24: Harold Mack, British animator and comics artist (worked for Gaumont British Animation, British Animated Pictures and Marten Toonder's animation studio, founder of the Anglo-Dutch Group), dies at age 67.
 December 26: Igor Podgorskiy, Russian animator, dies at age 53.

See also
1975 in anime

References

External links
Animated works of the year, listed in the IMDb

 
1970s in animation